Troy Township is the name of some places in the U.S. state of Minnesota:

Troy Township, Pipestone County, Minnesota
Troy Township, Renville County, Minnesota

See also

Troy Township (disambiguation)

Minnesota township disambiguation pages